Son Yeong-wan (born 4 March 1934) is a South Korean volleyball player. He competed in the men's tournament at the 1964 Summer Olympics.

References

1934 births
Living people
South Korean men's volleyball players
Olympic volleyball players of South Korea
Volleyball players at the 1964 Summer Olympics
Place of birth missing (living people)
Asian Games medalists in volleyball
Volleyball players at the 1958 Asian Games
Volleyball players at the 1962 Asian Games
Medalists at the 1958 Asian Games
Medalists at the 1962 Asian Games
Asian Games silver medalists for South Korea
20th-century South Korean people